Antonio De Vitis (born 16 May 1964) is a retired Italian footballer who played as a striker. He is the father of Alessandro De Vitis.

References

1964 births
Living people
Italian footballers
S.S.C. Napoli players
Palermo F.C. players
U.S. Salernitana 1919 players
Taranto F.C. 1927 players
Udinese Calcio players
Piacenza Calcio 1919 players
Hellas Verona F.C. players
Association football forwards
Serie A players